Waimārama is a seaside village in Hastings District, Hawke's Bay, New Zealand.

Waimārama is a popular surf beach, known as a beach break on a sandy beach, with a rocky point. It offers both left and right handers and conditions are often suitable for surfers of all levels. The beach has strong rip currents, and is patrolled by surf lifeguards at weekends from November to March.

Motu-o-Kura or Bare Island is located just off the coast and is a popular spot for fishing and diving. The beach town attracts people from across the region, with a restaurant, bar and shop. It also has about 240 permanent residents, with many former holiday baches becoming homes.

On 28 April 2011, heavy rain hit the village, causing floods and mudslides.

Demographics
It is part of the wider Kahuranaki statistical area.

Waimārama had a population of 216 at the 2018 New Zealand census, an increase of 33 people (18.0%) since the 2013 census, and a decrease of 6 people (−2.7%) since the 2006 census. There were 84 households, comprising 111 males and 105 females, giving a sex ratio of 1.06 males per female. The median age was 52.6 years (compared with 37.4 years nationally), with 36 people (16.7%) aged under 15 years, 30 (13.9%) aged 15 to 29, 105 (48.6%) aged 30 to 64, and 48 (22.2%) aged 65 or older.

Ethnicities were 80.6% European/Pākehā, 30.6% Māori, 2.8% Pacific peoples, 1.4% Asian, and 1.4% other ethnicities. People may identify with more than one ethnicity.

Although some people chose not to answer the census's question about religious affiliation, 44.4% had no religion, 44.4% were Christian, 2.8% had Māori religious beliefs and 1.4% had other religions.

Of those at least 15 years old, 27 (15.0%) people had a bachelor's or higher degree, and 33 (18.3%) people had no formal qualifications. The median income was $33,100, compared with $31,800 nationally. 27 people (15.0%) earned over $70,000 compared to 17.2% nationally. The employment status of those at least 15 was that 87 (48.3%) people were employed full-time, 30 (16.7%) were part-time, and 3 (1.7%) were unemployed.

Kahuranaki statistical area

Kahuranaki had a population of 1,413 at the 2018 New Zealand census, an increase of 240 people (20.5%) since the 2013 census, and an increase of 309 people (28.0%) since the 2006 census. There were 495 households, comprising 711 males and 702 females, giving a sex ratio of 1.01 males per female. The median age was 44.4 years (compared with 37.4 years nationally), with 285 people (20.2%) aged under 15 years, 207 (14.6%) aged 15 to 29, 720 (51.0%) aged 30 to 64, and 195 (13.8%) aged 65 or older.

Ethnicities were 87.3% European/Pākehā, 20.6% Māori, 1.3% Pacific peoples, 0.6% Asian, and 2.1% other ethnicities. People may identify with more than one ethnicity.

The percentage of people born overseas was 19.7, compared with 27.1% nationally.

Although some people chose not to answer the census's question about religious affiliation, 53.9% had no religion, 35.0% were Christian, 2.1% had Māori religious beliefs, 0.2% were Hindu, 0.2% were Muslim, 0.4% were Buddhist and 1.5% had other religions.

Of those at least 15 years old, 285 (25.3%) people had a bachelor's or higher degree, and 129 (11.4%) people had no formal qualifications. The median income was $37,500, compared with $31,800 nationally. 228 people (20.2%) earned over $70,000 compared to 17.2% nationally. The employment status of those at least 15 was that 615 (54.5%) people were employed full-time, 201 (17.8%) were part-time, and 30 (2.7%) were unemployed.

Marae

The local Waimārama Marae and Taupunga meeting house is a meeting place for the Ngāti Kahungunu hapū of Ngāti Hikatoa, Ngāti Kurukuru, Ngāti Urakiterangi and Ngāti Whakaiti.

In October 2020, the Government committed $6,020,910 from the Provincial Growth Fund to upgrade a group of 18 marae, including Waimārama Marae. The funding was expected to create 39 jobs.

Education

Notes

Further reading

Hastings District
Populated places in the Hawke's Bay Region
Beaches of the Hawke's Bay Region